The year 2001 is the first year in the history of Deep, a mixed martial arts promotion based in the Japan. In 2001 Deep held 3 events beginning with, Deep: 1st Impact.

Events list

Deep: 1st Impact

Deep: 1st Impact was an event held on January 8, 2001 at the Aichi Prefectural Gymnasium in Nagoya, Japan.

Results

Deep: 2nd Impact

Deep: 2nd Impact was an event held on August 18, 2001 at the Yokohama Cultural Gymnasium in Yokohama, Japan.

Results

Deep: 3rd Impact

Deep: 3rd Impact was an event held on December 23, 2001 at the Differ Ariake in Tokyo, Japan.

Results

See also 
 Deep
 List of Deep champions
 List of Deep events

References

Deep (mixed martial arts) events
2001 in mixed martial arts